Tomáš Svoboda (born February 24, 1987) is a Czech professional ice hockey forward who currently plays for Orli Znojmo of the 2nd Czech Republic Hockey League

Svoboda played previously in the Czech Extraliga for HC Slavia Praha, HC Kometa Brno, HC Vítkovice, HC Plzeň, HC Dynamo Pardubice and Piráti Chomutov.

References

External links

1987 births
Living people
Acadie–Bathurst Titan players
Czech ice hockey right wingers
Drummondville Voltigeurs players
HC Dynamo Pardubice players
BK Havlíčkův Brod players
HC Kometa Brno players
Piráti Chomutov players
HC Plzeň players
HC Slavia Praha players
SK Horácká Slavia Třebíč players
HC Vítkovice players
People from Litoměřice
Sportspeople from the Ústí nad Labem Region
Czech expatriate ice hockey players in Canada